Events in the year 1981 in Bulgaria.

Incumbents 

 General Secretaries of the Bulgarian Communist Party: Todor Zhivkov
 Chairmen of the Council of Ministers: Stanko Todorov (from 1971 until June 16) Grisha Filipov (from June 16 until 1986)

Events 

 The philosopher Zhelyu Zhelev publishes a book called "Fascism" in which he compares communism to fascism. Shortly after the books completion however, the government bans it from stores. The book becomes legally available again following the end of communist rule in Bulgaria.
 Elias Canetti wins the 1981 Nobel Prize in Literature "for writings marked by a broad outlook, a wealth of ideas and artistic power".
 Construction was completed on the Buzludzha Monument, to commemorate the early socialist movement in Bulgaria.

References 

 
1980s in Bulgaria
Years of the 20th century in Bulgaria
Bulgaria
Bulgaria